Perote may refer to:

Places
Mexico
 Perote, Veracruz

United States
 Perote, Alabama
 Perote, Wisconsin, a ghost town